Vitali Ivanovich Smolyaninov (born August 5, 1983) is a Kazakhstani former professional ice hockey player. He was selected by Tampa Bay Lightning in the 8th round (261st overall) of the 2001 NHL Entry Draft.

Sidorenko played in the Kontinental Hockey League with Barys Astana during the 2002-03 season, and with Krylja Sovetov during the 2008–09 KHL season.

Career statistics

Regular season and playoffs

International

References

External links
 

1983 births
Living people
Barys Nur-Sultan players
Kazakhstani ice hockey left wingers
Sportspeople from Karaganda
Tampa Bay Lightning draft picks